Roland Robert de la Maza (born November 11, 1971) is a former Major League Baseball player who played one game for the Kansas City Royals in 1997. 

His father, Rolando, was a Cuban immigrant. He attended St. Genevieve High School in California and later played college baseball at Sacramento State.

He was drafted by the Cleveland Indians in the 15th round of the 1993 Major League Baseball draft. On August 30, 1997, he was traded by the Cleveland Indians to the Kansas City Royals for Bip Roberts.

The only game he played was on September 26, 1997. He was substituted into the game for Kevin Appier in the sixth inning and allowed a home run to the first batter he faced, Ray Durham. He struck out the next batter, Mike Cameron, and retired five of the following six batters.

References

External links

Living people
1971 births
American sportspeople of Cuban descent
Baseball players from California
Buffalo Bisons (minor league) players
Canton-Akron Indians players
Kansas City Royals players
Kinston Indians players
Major League Baseball pitchers
People from Granada Hills, Los Angeles
Sacramento State Hornets baseball players